The Water-sprinkling festival (simplified Chinese 泼水节 ; traditional Chinese 潑水節; Pinyin: Pōshuǐ jié), is a traditional festival of the Dai nationality marking the Solar New Year. The Dai are an ethnic minority of China who primarily live in the Xishuangbanna Dai Autonomous Prefecture and Dehong Dai and Jingpo Autonomous Prefecture in southern Yunnan. The predominant religion of the Dai is Theravada Buddhism and religious activities are frequent. The Water-sprinkling festival is one of the most solemn traditional festivals of this nationality. Usually, the festival takes place ten days around the Tomb-sweeping day and lasts for three or four days, it generally occurs according to the Gregorian calendar from April 13 to 15.

On the first day, people row, put to rise(放高升, cultural and artistic performance; on the second day, people sprinkle water crazily; on the third day, the young men and women get together to lost package(丢包) and exchange of goods(物资交流).

Dates in Dai calendar

See also
List of festivals in China
Songkran
Water Festival
List of Buddhist festivals

References

Folk festivals in China
Buddhist festivals in China
Buddhist holidays
Cultural festivals in China
Spring (season) events in China